Qadaşbinə (also, Qadaşbina, Katsbina, and Kozbina) is a village in the Balakan Rayon of Azerbaijan.  The village forms part of the municipality of Püştətala.

References 

Populated places in Balakan District